Anthene villosa is a butterfly in the family Lycaenidae. It is found on Sulawesi, the Talaud Islands and the Sangir Archipelago.

References

Butterflies described in 1878
Anthene
Endemic fauna of Indonesia
Butterflies of Indonesia
Taxa named by Pieter Cornelius Tobias Snellen